Radiotelevisiun Svizra Rumantscha (RTR), formerly known as Radio e Televisiun Rumantscha, is a Swiss broadcasting company (part of SRG SSR) which offers programming to Romansh-speakers in Switzerland and around the world.

History

The first radio program in Romansh was broadcast on 17 January 1925. The person responsible for this broadcast was Felix Huonder. Regular Romansh programming began in 1943. Las Cristallas, the Romansh "radioscola" (radio school, or lectures delivered by radio broadcast), premiered on 27 January 1955.

Il Balcun Tort, the first television program in Romansh, was broadcast on 17 February 1963. This commemorated the 25th anniversary of Romansh's becoming Switzerland's fourth national language.

Broadcasting

Radio 

Radio RTR is a Swiss radio station broadcasting in Romansh. Editor in Chief is Flavio Bundi (*1987).

Television 
Televisiun Rumantscha (TvR) is RTR's television production unit. It does not have its own dedicated channel; instead RSI La 2, SRF 1, SRF zwei and SRF info air TvR programming for a few hours a day.

It produces 90 minutes of television programmes a week. Its programmes comprise approximately of 50 hours of in house productions, 6 hours of programmes purchased from another broadcaster and 20 hours of special occasions.

Editor in Chief is Flavio Bundi (*1987).

Notes and references

External links
Official website

Television networks in Switzerland
Radio in Switzerland
Publicly funded broadcasters
Swiss Broadcasting Corporation
Romansh language
Radio stations established in 1925
Television channels and stations established in 1955
1925 establishments in Switzerland